Piptadeniastrum africanum is a tall deciduous tree within the Fabaceae family (subfamily Mimosaidae), also called Piptadenia africana its timber is traded under the names, Dabema or Dahoma. It commonly occurs in freshwater swamp forests but can also be found further north.

Description 
The species is a medium-sized to large tree capable of growing to 50 meters tall, with the record being  199'1" (60.68 meters) and a maximum  girth a breast height of 14' 9" (4.5 meters) in Ghana | it has wide spreading branches. Its trunk is straight and cylindrical  while the base of the tree has thin buttress roots that can reach a height of 5 meters or more and extends along the ground, its bark is grey to brown in color but reddish at the base. Leaves are alternate, bipinnately compound in arrangement with about 10 - 20 pairs of pinnae and about 30 - 58 leaflets per each pinnae. Leaflets, sessile and small, 0.3 x 1 cm long and 0.8 x 1.25 mm wide, glossy green above and paler beneath. Flower is yellowish to white colored and fruit is a brown woody pod, .

Distribution 
Naturally occurs in the rain forest zones of West and Central Africa from Senegal to Sudan and moving southwards towards Northern Angola. It is locally known as Dabema in Ivory Coast and as Dahoma in Ghana.

Chemistry 
Methanol and aqueous extracts from the stem bark tested for the presence of flavonoids, phenols, tannins and saponins. Profiles of its compounds include a variety of dihydroxy-trimethoxy(iso)flavone isomers, apigenin, chrysoeriol, eriodictyol, luteolin, and liquiritigenin.

Uses 
The chemical compounds of Piptadeniastrum africanum has generated interest among researchers largely because of a wide variety of afflictions plant extracts are used to treat in traditional medicine. Extracts of the species in used to treat gastric ulcers, the Baka people of Cameroon use macerated stem bark extracts in preparations to treat abdominal pains. While some healers use leave extracts as a tonic or as an aphrodisiac. In Congo and Ghana, it is applied in native medicine as a treatment for back pains and sexual asthenia.

Its timber is valued for use in building canoes and in marine and bridge construction.

References 

Flora of West Tropical Africa
Flora of the Democratic Republic of the Congo
Mimosoids